Nuff Said may refer to:

'Nuff Said!, a 1968 album by Nina Simone
'Nuff Said (Ike & Tina Turner album), 1971
Nuff Said (2023), a National Wrestling Alliance pay-per-view event

See also
Nuf Ced, a nickname of Michael T. McGreevy
"Nuf Said", a song by Lil Tjay from his 2021 album Destined 2 Win